Alberto Mariscal (March 10, 1926 – April 24, 2010) was an American-born Mexican actor and film director.

Partial filmography

 Su última aventura (1946) - Reportero (uncredited)
 Barrio de pasiones (1948)
 Corner Stop (1948) - Mecánico (uncredited)
 La Mancornadora (1949)
 Carta Brava (1949) - Policia
 Hay lugar para... dos (1949)
 Confessions of a Taxi Driver (1949) - Constantino Escamilla Cejudo (Tino)
 Ventarrón (1949) - Alfredo
 Amor de la calle (1950) - Memo
 Vagabunda (1950) - Marcial
 El amor no es ciego (1950) - Joe Flores
 El sol sale para todos (1950)
 Flor de sangre (1951)
 Los hijos de la calle (1951) - Manos suave
 We Maids (1951) - Manuel
 The Martyr of Calvary (1952) - Anás el Joven
 Angélica (1952) - Mario
 La mentira (1952)
 María del Mar (1952)
 I Want to Live (1953) - Secuaz de Ángel
 Mercy (1953) - Antonio
 Padre nuestro (1953) - Enrique Molina
 Dreams of Glory (1953) - Ingeniero Ricardo Rojas
 El Monstruo resucitado (1953) - Mischa
 El aguila negra en 'El vengador solitario (1950)
 Me perderé contigo (1954)
 La venganza del Diablo (1955) - Carlos
 Sierra Baron (1958) - Lopez
 Pistolas de oro (1959)
 The Wonderful Country (1959) - (uncredited)
 La pandilla en acción (1959) - Asistente pelicula (uncredited)
 Que me maten en tus brazos (1961)
 Cazadores de cabezas (1962) - Carlos
 Servicio secreto (1962) - Locutor (uncredited)
 Dinamita Kid (1962) - Esbirro de Zarda (uncredited)
 El muchacho de Durango (1962) - Cantante
 Sangre en el ring (1962) - Gangster
 La barranca sangrienta (1962) - (uncredited)
 Santo contra el rey del crimen (1962)
 El tesoro del rey Salomón (1963) - Cazador (uncredited)
 Aventuras de las hermanas X (1963) - Renato Estrada
 Neutron vs. the Maniac (1964) - Captain Julio Fuentes
 El hijo de Gabino Barrera (1965)
 Bromas, S.A. (1967) - Rubén
 Primera comunión (1969)
 Las aventuras de Juliancito (1969) - Dr. Ramírez
 Los problemas de mamá (1970) - Director
 'El sabor de la venganza (1971 film) (1971) - Director
 Tívoli (1974) - Alcalde
 The Return of a Man Called Horse (1976) - Red Cloud
 Chicano (1976)
 El último disparo (1985)
 El gorra prieta (1993) - (final film role)

References

Bibliography 
 Rogelio Agrasánchez. Guillermo Calles: A Biography of the Actor and Mexican Cinema Pioneer. McFarland, 2010.

External links 
 

1926 births
2010 deaths
Mexican male film actors
American male film actors
Mexican film directors
People from Chicago
Film directors from Illinois
American emigrants to Mexico